Capital punishment was abolished for all crimes in Chad on April 28, 2020, following a unanimous vote by the National Assembly of Chad. Prior to 2020, Chad's 003/PR/2020 "anti-terrorism" law maintained the death penalty for terrorism-related offenses. Chad's new penal code, which was adopted in 2014 and promulgated in 2017, had abolished capital punishment for all other crimes.

Between 2003 and 2015, there were no executions in Chad. However, the moratorium on executions was ended in 2015, following an increase in terrorist attacks.

References

Chad
Law of Chad